Sątyrz Pierwszy  (German: Sadelberg) is a village in the administrative district of Gmina Chociwel, within Stargard County, West Pomeranian Voivodeship, in north-western Poland.

The village has a population of 27.

Before 1945 the village was German-settled and part of the German state of Prussia. For the history of the region, see History of Pomerania.

References

Villages in Stargard County